The Yockanookany River is a  river in central Mississippi in the United States.  It is a tributary of the Pearl River, which flows to the Gulf of Mexico.

Course
The Yockanookany rises in Choctaw County on the west side of the town of Ackerman and flows generally southwest through Attala and Leake counties, past the towns of Weir, McCool, Ethel and Kosciusko.  It flows into the Pearl River in southwestern Leake County.

The Yockanookany's upper course through Choctaw and Attala counties was channelized in 1914 and the middle section was completed in 1928; in some of these areas, water continues also to flow in the river's old natural channel. Low-water stages at the Koscuisko gauge in 1960 were six feet higher than those of 1939 as the channel silted significantly during that period.

Downstream of Kosciusko, the river is paralleled by the Natchez Trace Parkway.

Name
Yockanookany is a name derived from the Choctaw language purported to mean "land creek".

The United States Board on Geographic Names settled on "Yockanookany River" as the stream's name in 1949.  According to the Geographic Names Information System, the river has also been known as:
Yexgonnongoune River
Yockahockany River
Yockammockanna Creek
Yokahocany River
Yokahochany River
Yokahockana River
Yokahockany Creek
Yokahockany River

See also
List of Mississippi rivers

Sources

Columbia Gazetteer of North America entry

Landforms of Attala County, Mississippi
Landforms of Choctaw County, Mississippi
Landforms of Leake County, Mississippi
Rivers of Mississippi
Bodies of water of Leake County, Mississippi
Tributaries of the Pearl River (Mississippi–Louisiana)
Mississippi placenames of Native American origin